The North German thaler was the currency of the Landgravate, then Electorate of Hesse-Kassel (or Hesse-Cassel) until 1858. Until 1807, the Thaler was subdivided into 32 Albus, each of 12 Heller. It was worth th a Conventionsthaler from 1754 to 1841.

Between 1807 and 1813, the Westphalian Thaler and Westphalian Frank circulated in Hesse-Kassel.

The Thaler and Heller were reintroduced in 1813, but without the Albus (the last coins denominated in Albus were issued in 1782). Thus, 384 Heller = 1 Thaler. In 1819, the Thaler was set equal to the Prussian Thaler. In 1841, a new currency system was introduced, dividing the Thaler into 30 Silbergroschen, each of 12 Heller.

The Thaler was replaced at par by the Vereinsthaler.

References

External links
 

Currencies of Germany
Modern obsolete currencies
Early Modern currencies
1858 disestablishments
Coins of the Holy Roman Empire